When Animals Attack! is a series of television specials aired by Fox in the United States during the mid- to late-1990s. The specials compiled graphic clips of various animals attacking humans. 

The series was credited to the network's "alternate programming" head Mike Darnell. Robert Urich hosted When Animals Attack 1, 2, and 3, and Louis Gossett Jr. hosted When Animals Attack 4.

See also
 Pinky the Cat
 Binky (polar bear)
 Zoo (TV series)

Footnotes

External links

Television series about animals
Television series about violence
Fox Broadcasting Company original programming